Ellen Krügel is a retired East German slalom canoeist who competed in the late 1950s. She won two medals in the mixed C-2 event at the ICF Canoe Slalom World Championships with a silver in 1957 and a bronze in 1959.

References

East German female canoeists
Living people
Year of birth missing (living people)
Medalists at the ICF Canoe Slalom World Championships